Nancy Pukingrnak Aupaluktuq (born 1940) is a Canadian Inuit artist known for her sculptures, drawings, and textile art. Her work draws from Inuit mythology and features Western spatial perspective.

Early life 
Born in the Chantrey Inlet area of what is now the Kivalliq Region of Nunavut, Pukingrnak Aupaluktuq is the daughter of noted Inuit artist Jessie Oonark; among her siblings are the artists Victoria Mamnguqsualuk, Josiah Nuilaalik, Janet Kigusiuq, Mary Yuusipik Singaqti, Miriam Nanurluk, and William Noah. In childhood, she lived the traditional nomadic Inuit life, but the difficult winter of 1958 led to the family's resettlement in the community of Baker Lake, where shortly thereafter she married.

Career 
With encouragement from her mother and her sister Victoria, she began carving in 1962; her first drawings followed in 1969. She also works in fabric. Pukingrnak Aupaluktuq's work draws heavily on Inuit mythology, and includes depictions of Kiviuq and Kavaq. Unlike older Inuit artists, her work shows a knowledge of Western spatial perspective. Her art was first exhibited in 1974 at a showing of Baker Lake sculpture in Montreal, and in 1976 she had her first solo show, at the Upstairs Gallery in Winnipeg. She has continued to exhibit both in Canada and internationally. Pukingrnak Aupaluktuq's work is in the collections of the Canadian Museum of Civilization, the Department of Indian Affairs and Northern Development, the Winnipeg Art Gallery, the Macdonald Stewart Art Centre, and the Art Gallery of Ontario.

References

1940 births
Living people
Canadian women sculptors
Canadian textile artists
Inuit sculptors
Inuit textile artists
20th-century Canadian sculptors
20th-century Canadian women artists
21st-century Canadian sculptors
21st-century Canadian women artists
People from Baker Lake
Canadian Inuit women
Artists from Nunavut
20th-century women textile artists
20th-century textile artists
Inuit from the Northwest Territories
Inuit from Nunavut
Oonark family
21st-century women textile artists
21st-century textile artists